Karim Baylak-oolovich Sagan-ool is a Tuvan scientist and politician, currently serving as the Mayor of Kyzyl.

Personal life
He is married and has three daughters and one son.

References

See also
 Kyzyl
 Mayor of Kyzyl
 Tuvan Republic
 Vladislav Khovalyg

1977 births
Russian politicians
Living people
Mayors of Kyzyl